Weebit Nano is a public semiconductor IP company founded in Israel in 2015 and headquartered in Hod Hasharon, Israel. The company develops Resistive Random-Access Memory (ReRAM or RRAM) technologies which is a specialized form of non-volatile memory (NVM) for the semiconductor industry. The company’s products are targeted at a broad range of NVM markets where persistence, performance, and endurance are all required. ReRAM technology can be integrated in electronic devices like wearables, Internet of Things (IoT) endpoints, smartphones, robotics, autonomous vehicles, and 5G cellular communications, among other products. Weebit Nano’s IP can be licensed to semiconductor companies and semiconductor fabs.

Initial productization began with embedded ReRAM products (memory arrays embedded in Systems-on-Chips (SoCs) and will eventually be expanded to include discrete ReRAM products built into individual chip packages.

History 
The company began as a startup in Israel in 2015, founded on the roots of research and patents developed by Professor James Tour of Rice University, with a primary goal of productizing this ReRAM technology.

In 2016 the company successfully merged with Radar Iron of Australia, giving the merged entity the Weebit Nano name trading on the Australian Securities Exchange under the symbol WBT.

In 2016 Weebit Nano and CEA-Leti signed a memory development partnership agreement for the development of ReRAM technologies . Since then, Weebit Nano has been working closely with CEA-Leti on further developments and enhancements to its base ReRAM technologies, where Weebit Nano has commercialization rights to their joint developments. In November 2020 the Weebit/Leti partnership was extended to include further enhancements to Weebit's ReRAM technology, further development of its embedded memory module, and development of a selector for the stand-alone memory market.

David “Dadi” Perlmutter became Chairman of the Board of Directors of Weebit in May 2016.

In October 2017 Coby Hanoch joined the company as the CEO.

In November 2018, Weebit announced it was working with the NonVolatile Memory Research Group of the Indian Institute of Technology Delhi (IITD) on a project to research the use of Weebit’s ReRAM technology for certain types of neuromorphic applications – used for artificial intelligence.

In January 2019, Weebit announced its collaboration with a team at the Polytechnic University of Milan, to test, characterize and implement its developed algorithms using Weebit’s ReRAM. The goal of the project is to demonstrate the capability of ReRAM-based hardware in neuromorphic and artificial intelligence applications.

In February 2019, Weebit and the Technion – Israel Institute of Technology announced a collaboration to examine the possible use of ReRAM devices in a novel computing architecture that could speed up processing, memory transfer rate and memory bandwidth and decrease processing latency – while using less power.

In December 2019, XTX Technology and Weebit, verified the technical parameters of Weebit’s ReRAM array in XTX’s own labs. XTX successfully confirmed measurements on Weebit’s NVM that were previously achieved at French research institute Leti.

In February 2020, Weebit signed a Letter of intent with SiEn (QingDao) Integrated Circuits Co., Ltd. (SiEn) to jointly investigate ways in which Weebit’s technology can be used in SiEn’s products.

In October 2020, Weebit, together with Leti, completed its technology stabilization process so that its technology is now ready for transfer to a production fab.

In September 2021, Weebit and SkyWater Technology announced an agreement to take Weebit’s ReRAM to volume production. As part of the agreement, SkyWater has licensed Weebit’s ReRAM technology to use as embedded Non-Volatile Memory in customer designs.

In September 2021, Weebit, together with Leti, produced, tested and characterized fully functional 1 Mb ReRAM arrays in a 28 nm FDSOI process on 300mm wafers.

Weebit demonstrated its ReRAM IP module publicly for the first time in June 2022.

Also in June, Weebit taped out demo chips integrating its embedded ReRAM module to SkyWater Technology's foundry. This was followed in November 2022 with Weebit receiving from SkyWater the first production wafers incorporating its embedded ReRAM technology from Skywater -- the first time silicon wafers of Weebit ReRAM have been received from a production fab.

Leadership 
Weebit Nano is led by CEO Coby Hanoch. Hanoch has held roles as VP of Worldwide Sales and member of the Board of Directors of processor company Codasip; VP of Worldwide Sales at EDA company Jasper Design Automation and CEO of PacketLight, a developer of DWDN and OTN equipment for data transport. He was also a member of the founding team and VP at EDA company Verisity. He previously held engineering management roles with National Semiconductor.

The Weebit Nano board of directors includes:

 David “Dadi” Perlmutter (chairman), who is also chairman of the board for Teramount and the Israel Innovation Institute and was previously EVP, Chief Product Officer and GM of the Intel Architecture Group.
 Yoav Nissan Cohen, (executive director), who is also the CEO and founder of Zullavision and was previously President, Co-CEO, Chairman of Tower Semiconductor.
 Atiq Raza, (director), who is also executive chairman of Virsec Systems and previously held C-level positions at AMD and Raza Microelectronics.

Technology
Weebit Nano produces resistive random-access memory (ReRAM) which is a specialized type of random-access memory that maintains its state (and data) even if the device loses power. ReRAM is used in specialized environments where data must be preserved despite environmental challenges, such as aerospace, transportation and medical environments. There are two primary types of ReRAM, Conductive Bridge ReRAM (CBRAM) and Oxygen Vacancy ReRAM (OxRAM). Weebit Nano has productized OxRAM in its designs, and OxRAM is generally viewed to have better retention properties compared to CBRAM.

When fabricating the semiconductor wafers, memory technologies can be integrated during the  ‘front-end-of-line’ (FEOL)  process which happens in the early phase or later in the later phases during the back-end-of-line (BEOL) process. Weebit Nano’s ReRAM can be more easily integrated into fabrication flows because it happens during the later BEOL layers instead of the earlier FEOL layers.  There are two primary technologies that are used to fabricate transistors onto wafers, bulk CMOS and FD-SOI. Weebit Nano utilizes the CMOS-compatible process where the materials enable rapid development and integrating into any fab through the most common deposition techniques and tools.

Since 2016, Weebit Nano has collaborated on developing ReRAM technologies with CEA-Leti of France, one of the largest nanotechnology research institutes in Europe. The two organizations have collaborated on the 40 nm and 130 nm technology nodes.

Weebit and Leti have also shown a neuromorphic demo for Artificial Intelligence (AI) inference tasks where memory circuits are meant to mimic the actions of a human brain. The areas of focus for CEA-Leti and Weebit Nano as of November 2020 are around further enhancements to Weebit’s ReRAM technology.

Other key technical milestones include:
 November 2017 production of working 40 nm SiOx RRAM cell samples, with measurements performed on those cells on various wafers verifying the ability of its memory cells to maintain their memory behavior.
 June 2018 demonstration of a working 1Mbit ReRAM array manufactured using a 40 nm process technology
 August 2018 production of the first packaged units containing memory arrays based on Weebit’s ReRAM technology
 February 2020 demonstration of Spiking Neural Network using ReRAM
 October 2020 completion of the technology stabilization process so that Weebit’s technology is ready for transfer to a production fabrication plant.
 September 2021 production, testing and characterization of fully functional 1 Mb ReRAM arrays in a 28 nm FDSOI process on 300mm wafers
 December 2021 silicon demonstration wafers integrating Weebit’s embedded ReRAM module
 January 2022 demonstration of Weebit’s first crossbar ReRAM arrays
 March 2022 working with CEA-Leti to design an IP memory module integrating a multi-megabit ReRAM block targeting 22nm FD-SOI process
 October 2022 completed full technology qualification of its ReRAM module manufactured by its R&D partner CEA-Leti
 January 2023 worked with CEA-Leti and CEA-List to tape out a demo chip in a 22nm FD-SOI process

References

Israeli companies established in 2015
Semiconductor companies of Israel
Publicly traded companies
Computer memory companies
Companies listed on the Australian Securities Exchange